is a passenger railway station located in the city of Sanuki, Kagawa Prefecture, Japan. It is operated by JR Shikoku and has the station number "T16".

Lines
The station is served by the JR Shikoku Kōtoku Line and is located 23.4 km from the beginning of the line at Takamatsu. Only local services stop at the station.

Layout
Kanzaki Station consists of a side platform serving a single track. The station building is unstaffed and serves only as a waiting room. A short flight of steps leads up to the platform, rendering the station non-wheelchair accessible.

History
Japanese National Railways (JNR) opened Kanzaki Station on 27 January 1952 as an added stop on the existing Kōtoku Line. With the privatization of JNR on 1 April 1987, JR Shikoku assumed control and the stop was upgraded to a full station.

Surrounding area
Sanuki Municipal Kanzaki Elementary School
Fujii Gakuen Samukawa High School

See also
List of railway stations in Japan

References

External links

Station Timetable

Railway stations in Kagawa Prefecture
Railway stations in Japan opened in 1952
Sanuki, Kagawa